John Luxmoore or Luxmore (1766–1830) was an English bishop of three sees.

Life
The son of John Luxmoore of Okehampton, Devon, he was born there. He was educated at Ottery St. Mary school and at Eton College, going as a scholar in 1775 to King's College, Cambridge. He graduated B.A. in 1780 and proceeded M.A. in 1783.

On 30 June 1795 he was created D.D. at Lambeth by Archbishop John Moore. He became fellow of his college, and having been tutor to the Earl of Dalkeith, he obtained preferment. He was made rector of St. George's, Bloomsbury, in 1782, prebendary of Canterbury in 1703, dean of Gloucester in 1799, and rector of Taynton in 1800. In 1806 he exchanged St. George's, Bloomsbury, for St. Andrew's, Holborn. In 1807 he became bishop of Bristol, in 1808 he was translated as bishop of Hereford, and in 1815 to bishop of St Asaph. In 1808 he resigned the deanery of Gloucester and in 1816 the benefice of St. Andrew's, Holborn. Luxmoore held, as was usual, the archdeaconry of St Asaph at the same time as the bishopric, and had other preferments. He died at the palace, St Asaph, on 31 January 1830. He published a few charges and sermons.

Family
Luxmoore married a Miss Barnard, niece of Edward Barnard, provost of Eton, and left a large family. The eldest son, Charles Scott Luxmoore was himself an eminent clergyman

Notes

References

1766 births
1830 deaths
People educated at Eton College
Alumni of King's College, Cambridge
Bishops of Bristol
Bishops of Hereford
Bishops of St Asaph
Deans of Gloucester
English sermon writers
19th-century Church of England bishops
English male non-fiction writers
Clergy from Devon
People from Okehampton
19th-century Welsh Anglican bishops